MMXIV is a 2014 EP by Veruca Salt. This is their first release with the original lineup since Eight Arms to Hold You in 1997. It was released on vinyl for Record Store Day 2014. "The Museum of Broken Relationships" was later included on the band's album Ghost Notes (2015).

Track listing

V Side 
 "The Museum of Broken Relationships"
 "It's Holy"

S Side 
 "Seether"

Personnel
Louise Post – Guitar/Vocals
Nina Gordon – Guitar/Vocals
Steve Lack – Bass
Jim Shapiro – Drums

External links
 Official Website

Veruca Salt albums
2014 albums